This is a list of adverse effects of the antipsychotic drug lurasidone, sorted by frequency of occurrence.

Very common
Very common (>10% incidence) adverse effects include:
 Somnolence (dose-dependent; produces an intermediate degree of sedation compared to other atypical antipsychotics)
 Akathisia (dose-dependent)
 Fasting glucose increased
 Nausea
 Parkinsonism

Common
Common (1–10% incidence) adverse effects include:

 Vomiting
 Dyspepsia
 Agitation
 Anxiety
 Dystonia
 Dizziness
 Fatigue
 Back pain
 Restlessness
 Hypersalivation
 Weight gain

Uncommon
Uncommon (0.1–1% incidence) adverse effects include:

 Orthostatic hypotension
 Syncope
 Stroke
 Seizure
 Suicidal ideation
 Elevated serum creatinine

Rare
Rare (0.01–0.1% incidence) adverse effects include:

 Agranulocytosis
 Leukopaenia
 Neutropaenia
 Tardive dyskinesia
 Neuroleptic malignant syndrome

Unknown frequency
Unknown frequency adverse effects include:
 Transient ischaemic attack
 Hyperprolactinaemia (seems to be a rather prominent adverse effect according to a meta-analysis)
 Hypothermia

References

Lurasidone